Ali-Akbar Raefipour (born 1984) is an Iranian social media personality. He is the founder and the head of Masaf Institute, a well-known Iranian nationalizme movement think tank with a fan base of youth supporters.

Early life and career 
Raefipour was born in 1984. He claims to be a "university lecturer and researcher in the apocalyptic topics and cults" and has bold ideas on a wide range of topics including Satanism, freemasonry and Zionism. Raefipour is considered a conspiracy theorist. His frequent preachings has attracted a cult following particularly among "young hardliners". According to Abuzar Royesh and Shelby Grossman of Stanford Internet Observatory, Iran experts describe Raefipour as "a propagandist with ties to extreme elements within the Iranian regime". News outlets controlled by the Islamic Revolutionary Guard Corps (IRGC) often praise Raefipour's public speaches.

Raefipour is the founder and head of Masaf Institute, which is extensively active on social media. The organization is described as "affiliated" with the IRGC and a "government contractor". Masaf Institute uses accounts on platforms such as Twitter and Telegram.

Views and reception 
He is considered among the new generation of fundamentalist public speakers who, without an in-depth religious education, try to mix conspiracy theories with Shi'ite theological assertions in order to theorize the Iranian government and justify its policies. This new generation of fundamentalists which has emerged in the previous decade, and includes figures Hassan Abbasi and Hassan Rahimpour Azghadi, is characterized as more aggressive and ambitious than the previous generation and more adopt to the global conspiracy theories.

Raefipour claims that the word jeans comes from jinn. He also has stated that high-heeled shoes are designed to make female feet look like the hoofs of a jinn, and that T-shirts containing "spells or satanic slogans" are sold in the Iranian market. According to journalist Babak Dehghanpisheh, these remarks were in line with the Iranian government's dress code enforcement policy, at the time the Guidance Patrol had recently emerged.

He has applauded Chinese government and its election system, the latter because of depriving those who are not Communist Party members from voting. He has also stated that "Communist China's laws are exactly like laws of al-Moumenin".

As COVID-19 pandemic hit Iran in February 2020, he claimed that it was part of the U.S. hybrid war against China and Iran, and that the virus is an example of biological warfare. Afterwards, he called for enacting a law in the Iranian parliament that would allow retaliation against bio-terrorist attacks if they are proved to be used against Iran.

References 

9/11 conspiracy theorists
Anti-Zionism
1984 births
Living people
Critics of Judaism
Iranian conspiracy theorists
https://islampfr.com/masaf/